Zygogynum cristatum is a species of plant in the family Winteraceae. It is endemic to New Caledonia and is threatened by habitat loss.

Distribution
The plant is found at only two upland locations, in the region of Kouaoua at Mé Ori and Aréha.

Status and conservation
Major threats to the species include mining activities, fires and habitat clearance. Consequently, it is considered Vulnerable.

References

Endemic flora of New Caledonia
Vulnerable plants
Taxonomy articles created by Polbot
cristatum